James Matthew Salter (born 18 March 1976) is a former international freestyle swimmer for England and Great Britain.

Swimming career
He trained with the City of Edinburgh Swimming Club, Scotland under coach Tim Jones. Salter twice competed at the Summer Olympics (1996 and 2000) for Great Britain. He is best known for winning the 1997 European title in the men's 4×200 m freestyle relay, alongside Paul Palmer, Andrew Clayton and Gavin Meadows. He represented England and won a bronze medal in the freestyle relay event, at the 1994 Commonwealth Games in Victoria, British Columbia, Canada. Four years later he represented England again winning a silver medal in the same event. A third Games appearance came in 2002 where he also won a third freestyle relay medal.

He is a four times winner of the British Championship in 200 metres freestyle (1994, 1997, 2003, 2004) and twice 400 metres freestyle champion in 2002 and 2003.

See also
 List of Commonwealth Games medallists in swimming (men)

References

1976 births
Living people
English male freestyle swimmers
Olympic swimmers of Great Britain
Swimmers at the 1996 Summer Olympics
Swimmers at the 2000 Summer Olympics
Sportspeople from Bromsgrove
World Aquatics Championships medalists in swimming
Medalists at the FINA World Swimming Championships (25 m)
European Aquatics Championships medalists in swimming
Commonwealth Games medallists in swimming
Commonwealth Games bronze medallists for England
Swimmers at the 1994 Commonwealth Games
Swimmers at the 1998 Commonwealth Games
Swimmers at the 2002 Commonwealth Games
Medallists at the 1994 Commonwealth Games
Medallists at the 1998 Commonwealth Games
Medallists at the 2002 Commonwealth Games